Dwarfstar Games was a division of Heritage Models that published microgame-sized fantasy and science fiction board wargames in the early 1980s. They typically came with 12"x14" fold-out cardstock mapboards and 154 thin die-cut counters. The demise of its parent company also meant the end for Dwarfstar.

Dragon Rage was reissued in a much larger format, with an additional board and scenarios, by Flatlined Games (Belgium) in 2011.

Reception
Steve List reviewed the first four games from Dwarfstar Games in Ares Magazine #12 and commented that "one is outstanding, one quite good and the others somewhat underwhelming. But [for the price] they are not too much of an investment."

References

External links
Website offering free authorized download of seven of the Dwarfstar games

Board game publishing companies